Arantxa Sánchez Vicario and Helena Suková were the defending champions, but Sánchez Vicario did not compete this year.

Suková teamed up with Martina Navratilova and successfully defended her title, by defeating Lori McNeil and Rennae Stubbs 6–4, 6–3 in the final.

Seeds

Draw

Draw

References
 Official results archive (ITF) 
 Official results archive (WTA)

Toray Pan Pacific Open – Doubles
1993 Toray Pan Pacific Open